John Fendall may refer to:

John Fendall I (1672–1734), of Clivedon Hall, planter, justice, member of Lower House
John Fendall of Cedar Point (1730–1763), of Charles County, Maryland of the Fendall family
John Fendall Jr. (1762–1825), governor of Java and Bengal, member of British East India Company
John W. Fendall (1784–1842), midshipman during the Tripolitan War, and an army lieutenant during the War of 1812